Mihaljević or Mihaljevic is a surname, a patronymic of Mihael or Mihovil.

Notable people with the surname include:

Amy Mihaljevic (1978–1989), American elementary school student kidnapped and murdered in Ohio
Branko Mihaljević (1931–2005), composer, writer, journalist and radio editor

George Mihaljević (born 1936), Croatian-American former football player and coach
Igor Mihaljević (born 1979), Croatian heavyweight kickboxer
Joe Mihaljevic (born 1960), retired soccer forward
Radoslav Mihaljević (1426–1436), Serbian magnate in the service of Despots Stefan Lazarević and Đurađ Branković

See also
Branko Mihaljević Children's Theatre, a theatre located in Osijek, Croatia
Mihaljevići (disambiguation)
Mihajlović
Maljević
Miljević

References

Croatian surnames
Serbian surnames